Marie Manning may refer to:
 Marie Manning (writer)
 Marie Manning (murderer)

See also
Mary Manning (disambiguation)